Rufisque (Wolof: Tëngeéj) is a city in the Dakar region of western Senegal, at the base of the Cap-Vert Peninsula. It has a population of 179,797 (2002 census). In the past it was an important port city in its own right, but is now a suburb of Dakar.

History 

Originally a Lebou fishing village called Tenguedj, Rufisque became important in the 16th century as the principal port of the kingdom of Cayor, being frequented by Portuguese (who named it Rio Fresco, in which the name of the city originated from, meaning in English:"Freshwater River"), Dutch, French and English traders. A Euro-African Creole, or Métis, community of merchants grew up there, in close contact with similar communities in Saint Louis, Gorée and other places along the Petite Côte (Portudal, Joal) south to the Gambia River.

In 1840 a couple of Saint Louis merchants built warehouses on the waterfront to stock peanuts. Gorée merchants followed suit. There followed a period of commercial expansion as peanut production in Cayor boomed. In 1859 a fort was built by the French and Rufisque was annexed to the Colony of Senegal. The "Escale" commercial and administrative neighborhood along the waterfront was laid out in 1862—the African inhabitants being pushed out in the process. Rufisque became a "commune" in 1880 and its port was connected to the Dakar-Saint Louis railroad in 1885. In 1909 Galandou Diouf (died 1941) was elected to represent Rufisque in the General Council of the colony in Saint Louis, being the first African elected to that position.

Decline of port 
Early in the 20th century the growth of neighboring Dakar, with its superior port facilities, signaled the decline of Rufisque. No longer an active port, Rufisque has experienced steep decline of industrial activities and is certainly the most neglected of Senegal's four historic "communes", with no tourism sector and a chronic lack of investment in public infrastructure.

Industry 

Rufisque has a cement works.

Administration

Ndiawar Touré took office as Mayor of Rufisque on 8 June 2002. Previously, Mbaye-Jacques Diop was Mayor from 1987 to 2002, and he was subsequently designated as Honorary Mayor.

Notable people 
Papa Bouba Diop - footballer
Mamadou Seck (footballer) - footballer
Ousmane Diop Socé - writer and politician
Thierno Youm - footballer
Abdoulaye Sadji - Writer
Ismaila Lo - Musician

See also 
 Railway stations in Senegal

References

External links 
 Rufisque News, online version of Rufisque-based newspaper.
 Portions of this article were translated from French language Wikipedia's :fr:Rufisque.